The Front of Canalenan Unity (Frente de Unidad Canaleño) is a local political party in Villa Canales, Guatemala. FRUNCA evolved out of Frente Republicano Guatemalteco ahead of the 2004 municipal elections. FRG had held the municipality in the period 2000–2004, but due to massive corruption during the FRG tenency FRUNCA lost the elections. The symbol of FRUNCA is a pineapple. FRUNCA has two seats (out of 16) in the municipal council of Villa Canales.

See also
List of political parties in Guatemala

Political parties in Guatemala
Political parties with year of establishment missing